Arrowtown (Māori: Haehaenui) is a historic gold mining town in the Otago region of the South Island of New Zealand. Arrowtown is located on the banks of the Arrow River approximately 7.5 km from State Highway 6. Arrowtown is located 19.5 kilometres to the east of Queenstown. As well as the route via State Highway 6 between Arrowtown and Queenstown, there is also road access directly to Queenstown via the Shotover Gorge and a third route via the picturesque Lake Hayes.

There are many well preserved buildings that were used by the European and Chinese immigrants who settled during the town's gold mining era.

History
Gold was found in the Arrow River in 1862, and a township of 1,000 miners soon sprang up. It was initially named Fox's, based on William Fox's claim to have been first to find gold there, but was soon renamed Arrowtown. Chinese settlers, who first arrived in the 1870s in Arrowtown were forced to live in huts on the banks of Bush Creek. At the high point of the gold rush, the population of Arrowtown rose to over 7,000 and it became the centre of a larger municipality, which covered the new settlements of Macetown, Skippers Canyon and Bullendale (today only ghost towns).

Arrowtown was constituted as a borough in 1867 In 1874, the first mayor was elected. This was Samuel Goldston. A large fire burned down Campbell’s bakery, the Morning Star Hotel  and a significant portion of Pritchard’s Store in 1896.

In 1888, the name of Arrowtown had yet to be finalised with the local post office calling the town Arrow River, while the telegraph office referring to the town as Arrowtown.

After the gold rush ended, Arrowtown provided services to the local farms.

Arrowtown became part of the Queenstown-Lakes District in the local government reorganisation of 1989. 

Arrowtown was named "the most beautiful small town" in New Zealand in the 2020 Keep New Zealand Beautiful awards.

Climate 
Arrowtown sits at 482 metres above sea level. Arrowtown has been described as having four distinct seasons. The driest month of the year is February with 96mm of rain on average and the wettest month of the year is December with 144mm of rain on average. January is the warmest month of the year with an average maximum temperature of 16 and 18 degrees Celsius. July is the coolest month of the year with an average maximum temperature of 5 degrees Celsius.

Population

In 1951, the population of Arrowtown was 200 people, and this fell to 186 people in 1956 and 171 people in 1961 before increasing in size again. Despite the growth and construction, it falls under strict appearance covenants applied by the local authority that aim to preserve the appearance of the town.

Arrowtown had a population of 2,814 at the 2018 New Zealand census, an increase of 369 people (15.1%) since the 2013 census, and an increase of 666 people (31.0%) since the 2006 census. There were 993 households, with 1020 occupied private dwellings, 372 unoccupied private dwellings and 15 occupied non-private dwellings. There were 1,422 males and 1,392 females, giving a sex ratio of 1.02 males per female. The median age was 38.3 years (compared with 37.4 years nationally), with 588 people (20.9%) aged under 15 years, 450 (16.0%) aged 15 to 29, 1,443 (51.3%) aged 30 to 64, and 333 (11.8%) aged 65 or older.

Ethnicities were 90.2% European/Pākehā, 6.1% Māori, 1.5% Pacific peoples, 5.0% Asian, and 3.7% other ethnicities (totals add to more than 100% since people could identify with multiple ethnicities).

The proportion of people born overseas was 27.9%, compared with 27.1% nationally.

Although some people objected to giving their religion, 61.1% had no religion, 31.1% were Christian, 0.5% were Hindu, 0.1% were Muslim, 0.5% were Buddhist and 2.0% had other religions.

Of those at least 15 years old, 606 (27.2%) people had a bachelor or higher degree, and 216 (9.7%) people had no formal qualifications. The median income was $45,300, compared with $31,800 nationally. 534 people (24.0%) earned over $70,000 compared to 17.2% nationally. The employment status of those at least 15 was that 1,425 (64.0%) people were employed full-time, 372 (16.7%) were part-time, and 27 (1.2%) were unemployed.

Arrowtown Chinese settlement 

Arrowtown is the home of the historic Chinese Settlement which includes Ah Lum's store. This is located by Bush Creek and highlights the contribution of Chinese goldminers to the region. There are a number of restored miner's houses that can be visited.

Golf courses

The Hills golf course 
Bordering the town is Sir Michael Hill's Championship Golf Course which is home to the New Zealand Golf Open. The 2021 edition was cancelled and rescheduled to February 2022.

This championship golf course is a private membership club, but does allow green fee players by appointment only. The club also provides a Day Spa that is available to the public.

Millbrook golf course 
Nearby is the luxury Millbrook Resort, which has a spa and 27-hole golf course. It was the site of the agreement of the Millbrook Commonwealth Action Programme, a programme of the Commonwealth of Nations on the implementation of the Harare Declaration.

Arrowtown golf club 
Rated as one of the top ten golf courses in New Zealand, the golf course was originally established as a six-hole course in 1911. The club was re-established in 1935 at its present site. The current club house was built between 1956 and 1957. In 1971, the club obtained further land and expanded from a nine-hole course to an 18-hole course.

Education
The first school opened in Arrowtown in 1863. The original school building was a wooden single room building. In 1875 a new school building made of stone was constructed. By 1906 there were a total of six schools in the Arrowtown area including a high school. In 1997 the present school site on Centennial Avenue was opened.  The school roll numbered 187 pupils then.

Arrowtown School is the only remaining school in the town.

Lakes District museum 

The Lakes District Museum is located in a collection of historic buildings in Arrowtown. It details the history of the local area, in particular, gold mining and the early settlers. Work in 2020 and 2021 has started on earthquake strengthening the museum buildings and restoring the former Bank of New Zealand building to its original look. Queen Elizabeth, the Queen Mother visited the Lakes District museum in 1966. Queen Elizabeth II also visited the Lakes District museum in 1990.

Government 
The Queenstown-Lakes District Council provides local government services to Arrowtown. Arrowtown is part of the Southland electorate.

Swimming pool 
The Arrowtown Memorial Pool is run by the  Queenstown-Lakes District Council. The outdoor pool is open from the end of November until the start of March each summer. The main heated pool in 29 metres long and has five lanes. There is also a smaller heated toddler pool.

Mountain biking 
There are a number of mountain bike trails around Arrowtown. The most developed is the 110 kilometre Queenstown Trail. The Lake Hayes 16 kilometre loop is a popular ride also. The Arrow river bridges trail finishes in Gibbston and follows the Arrow river.

Notable buildings

Arrowtown Masonic Lodge 

The Lodge Arrow Kilwinning No 86 on Berkshire Street was completed in 1888. A six year project to restore the building was completed in 2010. It is a category one historic place.

Buckingham street historic area 

The seven houses located along Buckingham Street have mostly unaltered exteriors and were constructed in the 1870s. These surviving examples of cottages that gold miners of the time lived in are listed with Heritage New Zealand. The one bedroom property at 53 Buckingham Street was built in 1890 and was originally used as a chemist shop and then as a tailor's shop until 1905. It was sold for 350 pounds in the early 1950s. It was most recently sold in 2021 for $1.85 million dollars.

Saint Patrick's Catholic church 

Saint Patrick's, located on Hertford Street, was built between 1873 and 1902 and is a category two  historic place. The church was designed by architect F. W. Burwell. It has a gothic design and is built out of local schist rock with a Star of David rose window

Saint Paul's Anglican church 
Saint Paul's, is the oldest church in Arrowtown, having been built in 1871. Built out of wood in a simplified gothic revival style, the church was built at a cost of 350 pounds. The church is a category one historic place.

Arrowtown library 

The Arrowtown library was built in the 1980s and is on Buckingham street. Designed by architect Michael Wyatt, the building blends in with the town's 19th century buildings.

Festivals

Arrowtown autumn festival 
Arrowtown holds its annual autumn festival in April each year. The 2022 festival will be the 37th edition. Events include an art exhibition, a market day, parade gold panning championships and a dog show.

Arrow Sounds 
Arrow Sounds is a three day music festival due to be held in February 2022.

Air pollution 
In 2015, it was reported that Arrowtown had had one of its worst air pollution readings on record  reaching a level of 168 mcg per cubic metre of PM10 particulates. The last time this level had been reached was 2007. Arrowtown, along with Alexandra recorded the highest levels of air pollution in Otago. A combination of domestic wood burning heaters and the geography of the Arrowtown region causing temperature inversions was thought to be the problem. The issue was still present in 2019 with Arrowtown being labelled as having some of the worst air pollution in Australasia. 

NIWA deployed initially 22 sensors (which increased to a total of 48 sensors) in Arrowtown in 2019 to investigate the issue. They found that the air quality in the early afternoon was excellent at all locations. Poor air quality was linked to cold winter nights with a smaller impact on the following mornings. Air quality was better in the north-west of the town and worst in the south east of the town. The air quality was consistent with the usage of where in the town that domestic wood burning heaters were being used. The Otago Regional Council has been working with homeowners to replace their domestic wood burning heaters with cleaner heating devices such as heat pumps and improving insulation in homes.

Arrowtown had 23 high pollution nights, where PM10 particulate levels exceeded the national environmental standards in winter 2021. This decreased in winter 2022 to a total of 10 nights.

Notable people
 Ebenezer Sandford (1848–1897), politician
 Nora FitzGibbon (1889-1979), nurse
 Michael Hill, entrepreneur

References

External links

Arrowtown
Arrowtown Village Association

Populated places in Otago
Otago Gold Rush
1867 establishments in New Zealand
Populated places established in 1867